Fahad Al Mehalel (born November 11, 1970) is a retired Saudi Arabian football striker.

He played at a club level for Al-Shabab and Al-Nassr. For the national team, he played at the World Cups in 1994 and 1998 FIFA World Cup, as well as the 1997 FIFA Confederations Cup. He also played at the 1989 FIFA World Youth Championship.

Club Career Stats

References

External links

1970 births
Living people
Saudi Arabian footballers
Saudi Arabia international footballers
Association football forwards
Al-Shabab FC (Riyadh) players
Al Nassr FC players
1992 King Fahd Cup players
1992 AFC Asian Cup players
1994 FIFA World Cup players
1995 King Fahd Cup players
1996 AFC Asian Cup players
1997 FIFA Confederations Cup players
1998 FIFA World Cup players
AFC Asian Cup-winning players
Sportspeople from Riyadh
Saudi Professional League players